Juan Cabral may refer to:

 Juan Cabral (director) (born 1978), Argentine film director
 Juan Cabral (footballer) (born 1984), Paraguayan footballer
 Juan Bautista Cabral (1789–1813), Argentine soldier